Zhang Honglin (born 12 January 1994) is a male Chinese hurdler. He competed in the 110 metres hurdles event at the 2015 World Championships in Athletics in Beijing, but did not finish his heat.
 
His personal bests are 13.53 seconds in the 110 metres hurdles (+1.1 m/s, Shanghai 2015) and 7.78 seconds in the 60 metres hurdles (Shanghai 2015).

Competition record

See also
 China at the 2015 World Championships in Athletics

References

Chinese male hurdlers
Living people
Place of birth missing (living people)
1994 births
World Athletics Championships athletes for China